Ayk or AYK may refer to:

People
Ayk Kazaryan (born 1993), Russian football player of Armenian origin

Media
Ayk (daily), a Lebanese-Armenian daily newspaper

Abbreviations
Aoyagi Metals Company
Arkalyk Airport (IATA: AYK), an airport in Kazakhstan
ISO 639:ayk, ISO for Akuku language

See also
AN/AYK-14, an airborne computer
AN/UYK-44, standard 16-bit minicomputer of the United States Navy
AYK Radiant, an electric 1/10 scale 4WD Radio Control vehicle made by Aoyagi Metals Company (AYK)